Cummins Quantum Series is a family of diesel internal combustion engines, developed and manufactured by American Cummins for various heavy-duty use cases. The Quantum series comes with an electronic controlled module. It is used in heavy duty machines and in railway machines.

Current types

QSF 2.8-litre I4
QSF 3.8-litre I4
QSB 4.5-litre I4
QSB 6.7-litre I6
QSL 9-litre I6
QSG 12-litre I6
QSX 15-litre I6
QSK 19-litre I6
QSK 23-litre I6
QST 30-litre V12
QSK 38-litre V12
QSK 45-litre V12
QSK 50-litre V16
QSK 60-litre V16
QSK 78-litre V18
QSK 95-litre V16
QSK 120-litre V20

References

Cummins diesel engines